The Kingdom of Karagwe was located in the north-western part of Tanzania. It was also known as Bunyambo. The title of the King was Omuggabe. The Abagabe that ruled this kingdom were as follows:

Nono
Maliza (Queen)
Wamala
Ruhinda I Rwa Njunanaki Rwa Igaba
Ntare I
Ruhinda II
Ntare II
Ruhinda III
Ruhinda IV
Ntare IV
Ruhinda V
Ntare V
Rusatira (died 1725)
Mahinga (1725 - 1750)
Kalemera I Ntagara Bwiragenda (1750–1775)
Ntare VI Kitabanyoro (1775–1795)
Ruhinda VI Orushongo Rwanyabugondo (1795–1820)
Ntagara I Ruzingomucucu Rwa Mkwanzi (1820–1855)
Rumanika I Rugunda (1855–1881)
Kalemera II Kanyenje (1881–1882)
Ndagara II Nyamukuba (1882–1893)
Ntare VII (1893–1914)
Gahigi I (1914–1916)
Rumanika II -1st round (1916–1939)
Ruhinda VII Rutogo (15 Feb 1939 - 1962)
Rumanika II-2nd round (1962)

History of Tanzania
African kings